Elisabetta is an Italian feminine given name related to Elizabeth.
 Elisabetta Artuso (born 1974), Italian former middle distance runner
 Elisabetta Barbato (1921–2014), Italian operatic soprano
 Elisabetta Casellati (born 1946), Italian politician and the first Italian woman president of the Italian Senate
 Elisabetta Dami (born 1958), Italian children's books author, creator of the character Geronimo Stilton
 Elisabetta de Gambarini (1730–1765), English composer, mezzo-soprano, organist, harpsichordist, pianist, orchestra conductor and painter
 Elisabetta Gardini (born 1956), Italian politician, TV presenter and actress
 Elisabetta Gonzaga (1471–1526), Italian noblewoman renowned for her cultured and virtuous life
 Elisabetta Grimani (died 1792), wife of the last Doge of Venice
 Elisabetta Keller (1891–1969), Swiss painter
 Elisabetta Querini (1628–1709), wife of the Doge of Venice by marriage
 Elisabetta Sanna (1788–1857), Italian Roman Catholic who was beatified
 Elisabetta Sirani (1638–1665), Italian Baroque painter and printmaker
 Elisabetta Terabust (1946–2018), Italian ballerina and company director
 Elisabetta Trenta (born 1967), Italian politician who served as the Italian Minister of Defence
 Elisabetta Vendramini (1790–1860), Italian Roman Catholic nun who established the Franciscan Elizabethan Sisters
 Elisabetta Visconti (1374–1432), Duchess of Bavaria by marriage

Italian feminine given names